The 17611 / 17612 Hazur Sahib Nanded–Mumbai Chhatrapati Shivaji Maharaj Terminus Rajya Rani Express is an Express train of the Rajya Rani Express category belonging to Indian Railways – South Central Railway zone that runs between  and Chhatrapati Shivaji Maharaj Terminus in India.

It operates as train number 17611 from Hazur Sahib Nanded to Chhatrapati Shivaji Maharaj Terminus and as train number 17612 in the reverse direction, serving the state of Maharashtra.

Coaches
This train has 1 AC chair car, 10 (S1, S2, S3 up to S10), second class seating, 1 monthly seasonal ticket coach and 8+ sleeper class coach, general unreserved coaches. It has a pantry car.

As is customary with most train services in India, coach composition may be amended at the discretion of Indian Railways depending on demand.

Service
The 17611 / 17612 Hazur Sahib Nanded–Mumbai Chhatrapati Shivaji Maharaj Terminus Rajya Rani Superfast Express covers the distance of 594 kilometres in 12 hours 00 mins (55.47 km/hr) in both directions.

As the average speed of the train is above 55 km/hr, as per Indian Railways rules, its fare includes a Superfast surcharge.

Routing

Background

But there was a demand for increased connectivity between Nanded and Mumbai and thereafter this train was extended up to Hazur Sahib Nanded on 10 January 2020 and Rakes Shifted to South Central Railway zone and runs as Nanded Mumbai Rajyarani Express.

Traction
The route is not fully electrified. A Gooty-based WDP-4D diesel locomotive hauls the train from Hazur Sahib Nanded to Chhatrapati Shivaji Maharaj Terminus, and vice versa.

Timings

17611 Hazur Sahib Nanded–Mumbai Chhatrapati Shivaji Maharaj Terminus Rajya Rani Superfast Express leaves Hazur Sahib Nanded on a daily basis at 22:00 hrs IST and reaches Chhatrapati Shivaji Maharaj Terminus at 09:00 hrs IST the next day.

17612 Mumbai Chhatrapati Shivaji Maharaj Terminus–Hazur Sahib Nanded Rajya Rani Superfast Express leaves Chhatrapati Shivaji Maharaj Terminus on a daily basis at 19:00 hrs IST and reaches Hazur Sahib Nanded at 07:00 hrs IST the next day.

Gallery

See also
 Godavari Superfast Express
 Panchvati Express

References

External links

Transport in Mumbai
Transport in Manmad
Rajya Rani Express trains
Rail transport in Maharashtra